The Macomb County Board of Commissioners serves as the "county commission", or legislative body for Macomb County, Michigan, United States, the third largest county in Michigan with a population of 840,978, according to the 2010 census.

The powers, duties, and responsibilities of the Macomb County Board are established by Michigan law and the county charter approved by voters in 2009, and commissioners are elected to a two-year term every other year. The Board's 13 members represent districts of (approximately) equal population, and members serve on the Finance/Audit/Budget, Government Oversight, Internal Services, Public Safety and Records, Health and Human Services committees.

Previously made up of 26 members with both administrative and legislative control of county departments and budgets, the Board was reduced from 26 to 13 members in January 2011, when a new county charter was enacted and Macomb County's first Executive was elected to oversee administrative functions.

Members
In 2011 the Board appointed its first Republican as Chair, Kathy D. Vosburg  of Chesterfield Township, Michigan. Commissioner Vosburg is the third woman to Chair the Board, preceded by Nancy M. White and Diana J. Kolakowski.

The 2011-12 Board consisted of Commissioners Kathy D. Vosburg (Chair), Don Brown, Phillip A. DiMaria, Marvin E. Sauger (Vice Chair), David Flynn, Kathy Tocco, James L. Carabelli, Toni Moceri, Roland Fraschetti, Ray Gralewski, Fred Miller (Sergeant-at-Arms), Joe Sabatini and Bob Smith.

The Board's longest consecutively serving member as Commissioner is Don Brown (30 years).

The 2021-2022 makeup of the Board is as follows:

 District 1: (D-Warren) Michelle Nard
 District 2: (D-Warren) Mai Xiong
 District 3: (D-Eastpointe) Veronica Klinefelt
 District 4: (R-Sterling Heights) Joseph Romano
 District 5: (R-Sterling Heights) Don VanSyckel
 District 6: (R-Shelby Township) Jeff Farrington
 District 7: (R-Washington Township) Don Brown-- Board Chair
 District 8: (R-Chesterfield Township) Phil Kraft
 District 9: (D-Mount Clemens) Antoinette Wallace
 District 10: (R-Harrison Township) Barbara Zinner --Sergeant-at-Arms
 District 11: (D-Roseville) Harold Haugh-- Vice Chair
 District 12: (D-Clinton Township) Julie Matuzak
 District 13: (R-Macomb Township) Joe Sabatini

References

External links 

Macomb County, Michigan
Local government in Michigan